Pop, stylized in all caps, is a British free-to-air children's television channel owned by Narrative Entertainment UK Limited, targeting audiences aged 6 to 10. Launched on 1 October 2002 as Toons&Tunes by Chart Show Channels (CSC) Media Group, it later took on its current name and got sold to Sony Pictures Television, who in turn sold it and its local channels to its current owner in 2021.

History
Pop was originally launched on 29 May 2003 by Chart Show Channels (CSC) Media Group as Toons&Tunes. Toons&Tunes was then later rebranded as its current name, Pop (formerly stylized as pop and POP!) in the following month.

In the channel's early years, links were presented by Rorry, a lime green dragon with a Scottish accent, who was animated live. He was accompanied by Purrdy, a dragon/cat hybrid who also appeared in the original Tricky programme on ITV1, it was sometimes followed by a programme known as "The Cheeky Monkey Show" which features the live links of the animated coloured monkeys known as "The Cheeky Monkeys," that was later known by appearing on its sister channel Tiny Pop until its retirement at the end of June 2009.

Originally, the network focused on music videos with animated programming also part of the schedule, but with the numerous music video network options on British television at the time, this focus was quickly abandoned in 2004, when the animated content became much more prominent. Music videos continued to be carried on and off until 2010, before eventually being abandoned entirely.

On 1 September 2020, Pop rebranded its on-air identity, with the premiere of Bakugan: Armored Alliance. And on the same day, starting with Pokémon Journeys: The Series, the network became the new British home of the Pokémon anime, moving from its previous broadcasters, ITV1 and CITV, of over 20 years.

On 9 November 2022, Narrative Entertainment announced the launch of a new FAST channel, Pop Kids, to stream on Samsung TV Plus, the new FAST network airs shows from Pop and Tiny Pop.

Sky channel moves
On 24 May 2007, Pop moved from 619 to 616.

On 19 May 2008, Pop +1 ceased broadcast on 627.

On 14 July 2014, Pop +1 relaunched from 629.

On 1 October 2015, Pop +1 moved from 629 to 626.

As part of the major EPG reshuffle on 1 May 2018, Pop +1 moved from channel 626 to 625.

On 11 January 2021, Pop moved from 616 to 614.

On 11 January 2021, Pop +1 moved from 625 to 619.

Availability

Cable
Virgin Media : Channel 736 (SD)

Online
FilmOn : Watch live
Virgin TV Anywhere : VirginMedia.com

Satellite
Freesat : Channel 603 (SD) and Manual (+1)
Sky  and Sky : Channel 614 (SD) and Channel 619 (+1)

Terrestrial
Freeview : Channel 206 (SD) and Channel 208 (Pop Player)

Programming
The channel sources its programming from multiple production and distribution studios.

Current programming

Original programming
 Swipe It! With Joe Tasker

Acquired programming

 44 Cats
 Alvinnn!!! and the Chipmunks (also on Nickelodeon)
 Annedroids
 Bakugan
 Bakugan: Battle Planet
 Bakugan: Armored Alliance
 Bakugan: Geogan Rising
 Bakugan: Evolutions
 Barbie Dreamhouse Adventures
 Barbie: It Takes Two
 Big Top Academy
 Care Bears: Unlock the Magic (also on Sky Kids and Tiny Pop)
 Cupcake & Dino: General Services
 Dragon Ball Super
 Droners
 Grizzy & the Lemmings  (also on Boomerang)
 Kipo and the Age of Wonderbeasts
 Kung Fu Sock
 Lego City Adventures (also on Nickelodeon)
 Lego Friends: Girls on a Mission
 Mega Man: Fully Charged
 Miraculous: Tales of Ladybug & Cat Noir
 Nate Is Late
 Polly Pocket
 Pokémon
 Pokémon Journeys: The Series
 Pokémon Master Journeys: The Series
 Pokémon Ultimate Journeys: The Series
 Power Rangers
 Power Rangers Dino Super Charge
 Power Rangers Beast Morphers
 Power Rangers Dino Fury
 Rainbow Butterfly Unicorn Kitty
 Sadie Sparks
 She-Ra and the Princesses of Power
 Skylanders Academy
 Squish
 Space Chickens in Space
 The Inbestigators
 The Strange Chores
 Toca Life Stories
 Talking Tom and Friends
 Total DramaRama
 Transformers: Cyberverse
 Trolls: The Beat Goes On! (also on Tiny Pop)

Pop Player exclusive programming
 Big Top Academy: School's Out Edition
 Total Drama Island

Pop Kids Programming (only on Samsung TV Plus)

 Agent Binky: Pets of the Universe
 Care Bears: Unlock the Magic
 Cookie Monster's Foodie Truck
 Dragon Ball Super
 Kung Fu Sock
 Miraculous: Tales of Ladybug & Cat Noir
 Pokémon
 Simon
 Squish

Films and Specials
 Barbie (since 2018)
 Master Moley By Royal Invitation
 Miraculous World: New York, United Heroez
 Miraculous World: Shanghai, The Legend of Ladydragon
 Pokémon the Movie: Kyurem vs. the Sword of Justice (also on CBBC and BBC iPlayer)
 Pokémon the Movie: Diancie and the Cocoon of Destruction
 Pokémon the Movie: Hoopa and the Clash of Ages
 Pokémon the Movie: Volcanion and the Mechanical Marvel
 Pokémon the Movie: I Choose You! (also on CBBC and BBC iPlayer)
 Pokémon: Lucario and the Mystery of Mew
 Pokémon Ranger and the Temple of the Sea
 Pokémon the Movie: The Power of Us (also on CBBC and BBC iPlayer)

Upcoming acquired programming
Bakugan: Legends

Former programming

 3 Amigonauts
 The Adventures of Chuck and Friends
 Adventures of Sonic the Hedgehog
 The Adventures of Super Mario Bros. 3
 Alan the Last Dinosaur
 The Amazing Adrenalini Brothers
 Angry Birds Toons
 Animal Exploration with Jarod Miller
 Archie's Weird Mysteries
 Artzooka!
 The Babaloos
 Babar
 Backyard Science
 Battle B-Daman
 The Berenstain Bears
 Bindi the Jungle Girl
 Blazing Dragons
 Bump in the Night
 Buzz Bumble
 Captain Flinn and the Pirate Dinosaurs
 The Care Bears Family
 Care Bears: Welcome to Care-a-Lot
 Clang Invasion
 Clay Kids
 Clifford the Big Red Dog
 Counterfeit Cat
 Corduroy
 Cosmic Quantum Ray
 Cubix
 Cyberchase
 Dennis the Menace
 Digimon Data Squad
 Dinotrux
 Dr. Dimensionpants
 The Eggs
 Ella the Elephant
 Eliot Kid
 Elliot Moose
 Erky Perky
 Fairy Tale Police Department
 Fantomcat
 Finding Stuff Out
 Flatmania
 Funnymals
 Freaktown
 Gasp!
 Gawayn
 The Gees
 George and Martha
 Girlstuff/Boystuff
 Grojband
 Grossology
 H2O: Just Add Water
 Hanazuki: Full of Treasures
 Hareport
 Harry and His Bucket Full of Dinosaurs
 I.N.K. Invisible Network of Kids
 Iggy Arbuckle
 Insectibles
 Inspector Gadget
 Jamie's Got Tentacles
 Kaleido Star
 Kampung Boy
 Kid Detectives
 Kikoriki
 Kirby: Right Back at Ya!
 King
 King Arthur's Disasters
 The Legend of White Fang
 Larva
 LEGO Nexo Knights
 Little Wizard Tao
 Littlest Pet Shop
 Loggerheads
 Lola & Virginia
 Madeline
 Magi-Nation
 The Magic School Bus
 Marvin the Tap-Dancing Horse
 Milly, Molly
 Meet the Magoons
 Mischief City
 The Mr. Peabody & Sherman Show
 Mona the Vampire
 My Little Pony: Friendship is Magic
 The New Adventures of Lassie
 The New Adventures of Nanoboy
 Noah's Island
 Numb Chucks
 Numberjacks
 Oggy and the Cockroaches
 Oh No! It's an Alien Invasion
 Old Tom
 Oscar's Oasis
 Out of the Box
 Pandalian
 Pat & Stan
 Patrol 03
 Pearlie
 Peg + Cat
 Pigeon Boy
 PINY: Institute of New York
 Pippi Longstocking
 Pirate Express
 Pokémon
 Pokémon: Black & White (now on CBBC and BBC iPlayer)
 Pokémon: Black & White: Adventures in Unova (now on CBBC and BBC iPlayer)
 Pokémon: Black & White: Adventures in Unova and Beyond (now on CBBC and BBC iPlayer)
 Pokémon: Black & White: Rival Destinies (now on CBBC and BBC iPlayer)
 Pokémon the Series: Sun & Moon (now on CBBC and BBC iPlayer)
 Pokémon the Series: Sun & Moon – Ultra Adventures (now on CBBC and BBC iPlayer)
 Pokémon the Series: Sun & Moon – Ultra Legends (now on CBBC and BBC iPlayer)
 Power Players
 Power Rangers Megaforce
 Power Rangers Ninja Steel
 Power Rangers Super Megaforce
 The Raggy Dolls
 Redwall
 Rekkit Rabbit
 Robin Hood: Mischief in Sherwood
 Robinson Sucroe
 Rocky and the Dodos
 Ruby Gloom
 Rupert
 Sabrina: Secrets of a Teenage Witch
 Sally Bollywood: Super Detective
 SamSam
 Scaredy Squirrel
 Seven Little Monsters
 Sherlock Yack
 Slugterra
 The Smurfs
 The Snorks
 Sonic Boom
 Sonic the Hedgehog
 Sonic Underground
 Sparkle Friends
 Stickin' Around
 Spirit Riding Free
 Super Duper Sumos
 Super Mario World
 Talking Tom Heroes
 Timothy Goes to School
 The Tom and Jerry Comedy Show
 Totally Spies! (reruns)
 Tracey McBean
 Tractor Tom
 The Trap Door
 The Transformers
 Transformers: Rescue Bots
 Trollhunters: Tales of Arcadia
 Tube Mice
 Twipsy
 Vic the Viking
 Voltron: Legendary Defender
 The Wacky World of Tex Avery
 What About Mimi?
 Wild But True
 Wild Kratts
 Winx Club
 The Wizard of Oz
 What-A-Mess (DiC Version)
 YooHoo & Friends
 Yu-Gi-Oh! Zexal
 Zak Storm
 Zatch Bell!
 Zeke's Pad
 Zorro: Generation Z

Films and Specials
 Matilda
 Monster High
 Pokémon the Movie: Black—Victini and Reshiram and White—Victini and Zekrom (now on CBBC, Pop Max, and BBC iPlayer)
 Pokémon the Movie: Genesect and the Legend Awakened (now on CBBC, Pop Max, and BBC iPlayer)

Availability

Freeview
On 20 March 2014, Pop was launched on Freeview. Prior to April 2016, Pop was only available in areas where there is a local TV channel. On 1 April 2016, Pop moved to a wider coverage nationwide freeview mix, becoming available to over 90% of the country. The capacity vacated by Pop on the local multiplex was used to transmit Kix from 7 April 2016. Pop +1 moved to LCN channel 128, to release 127 for use by Kix, but was otherwise unaffected, continuing to broadcast locally to Manchester only.

On-demand
Pop programming in addition to content from sister channels Pop Max and Tiny Pop are available to stream on demand from the free TV service and mobile app Pop Player and since May 2022, available on Freeview Channel 208.

Related services

Pop +1
A time shift feed called Pop +1 was available until 2008, when it was replaced by Kix!; in turn, that network's +1 feed was discontinued on 14 July 2014 with Pop +1's return.

Pop Kids
A FAST channel launched on Samsung TV Plus in November 2022. It shows a list of programs from across Pop and Tiny Pop.

International versions
On 4 May 2017, Sony Pictures Television launched an Italian version of Pop as their first Italian free-to-air offering, with a similar line-up of programming to the UK channel. The network closed alongside its sister channel Cine Sony on 11 July 2019, after Mediaset purchased both network slots from Sony. Pop's old slot would be used for Boing Plus.

The Pakistani version of Pop is operated by Edutainment (Pty.) Ltd. under the license from Sony Pictures Television.

Notes

References

External links

CSC Media Group
Children's television networks
Children's television channels in the United Kingdom
English-language television stations in the United Kingdom
Television channels and stations established in 2003
Television channels in the United Kingdom
Sony Pictures Television
2003 establishments in the United Kingdom